My Big Fat Greek Wedding 2 is a 2016 American romantic comedy film directed by Kirk Jones and written by Nia Vardalos. The film stars Vardalos, John Corbett, Lainie Kazan, Michael Constantine (in his final film role), Andrea Martin, Ian Gomez and Elena Kampouris. It is the sequel to the 2002 film My Big Fat Greek Wedding and the second installment in the My Big Fat Greek Wedding series. Filming began in late May 2015 in Toronto. The film was released on March 25, 2016, by Universal Pictures, receiving negative reviews from critics. The film grossed $90.6 million worldwide against a $18 million budget. A third film, entitled My Big Fat Greek Wedding 3, is currently in production at Universal Pictures' division Focus Features.

Plot
Toula Portokalos-Miller's life is in shambles. Her travel agency and the family dry cleaners have closed due to the recession. The only business still open is the family restaurant that her father, Gus, still runs. Her husband, Ian, is the principal at their teen-aged daughter Paris' high school. Paris, who is applying to college, feels smothered by her close-knit clan, who constantly interfere in her life. Desperate for independence and privacy, she applies to schools across the country. Ian and Toula's marriage has become strained due to Toula's obsessive need to be involved in Paris' life and to "fix" whatever goes wrong in her family.

Meanwhile, Gus has convinced himself that he is directly descended from Alexander the Great and wants to write to an online ancestry site for confirmation. While sorting through his records, he discovers that his and Maria's marriage certificate was never signed by the priest, technically invalidating their union. His current priest isn't allowed to sign it but agrees to perform a new ceremony. Gus insists that he and Maria must marry again after fifty years together, but Maria wants Gus to propose properly. Gus refuses, infuriating Maria, who refuses to go through with the ceremony. Meanwhile, when Toula and Ian are on a date night to rekindle their romance, their family catches them making out in their car outside their house. After Gus lands in the hospital and Maria refuses to go, saying she is not his wife, Gus pleads for her to marry him again. This time, she accepts.

Maria wants the wedding she never had and hires a wedding planner who quits after the rowdy family's choices become too outlandish. The whole family, including Ian's parents, Rodney and Harriet, and Angelo's business partner, Patrick, pitch in to make the wedding happen. Nick urges Angelo to tell his parents, Voula and Taki, that Patrick is also Angelo's romantic partner. Gus's estranged brother, Panos, arrives from Greece as a surprise.

Paris has been accepted to Northwestern University in Chicago and NYU in New York City. She chooses Northwestern to please her mother, but Paris' great-grandmother convinces her she should go to New York. Paris asks Bennett, a boy she has a crush on, to the prom. He is also Greek, with an equally crazy Greek family. Prom is the same night as the wedding. Toula tells Paris she can go to the prom if she attends the reception later. En route to the church, Gus, Panos, and Taki arrive drunk after many shots of ouzo. Maria storms off to the vestry after seeing Gus acting foolishly, feeling he is not taking the wedding seriously. Panos tells Maria that Gus had confided to him his love for Maria, and the ceremony continues. Watching as Gus and Maria renew their marriage ceremony (Greeks don't recite vows), Ian and Toula privately renew theirs. At the prom, Paris and Bennett share their first kiss while slow-dancing.

At the wedding reception, Gus reads a letter from the ancestry site verifying that he is a descendant of Alexander the Great. Ian, however, realizes that Toula forged the letter to make her father happy. The movie ends with the entire family dropping Paris off at her college dorm in New York.

Cast
 Nia Vardalos as Fotoula "Toula" Portokalos-Miller
 John Corbett as Ian Miller, Toula's husband. In the first film, he worked as an English teacher. In the second film, he now works as the principal of the same school.
 Elena Kampouris as Paris Miller, Toula and Ian's 17-year-old daughter
 Lainie Kazan as Maria Portokalos, Toula's mother
 Michael Constantine as Kostas "Gus" Portokalos, Toula's heavily stubborn father, who constantly pressures his family into getting married regardless of age.
 Andrea Martin as Theia Voula, Toula's aunt and Maria's sister. Voula seems to fill the void left by the travel agency by taking an almost impertinent interest in her family's affairs. She tends to tell people disturbing stories about her medical issues and sex life with her husband Taki, much to Toula's annoyance.
 Louis Mandylor as Nick Portokalos, Toula's brother, he worked in the kitchen in his father's restaurant and lived his life as a bachelor in the first film. In the second film, he is now married and has four sons.
 Gia Carides as Cousin Nikki, Voula's daughter, Toula's cousin and best friend, and Paris's (and Ian's) godmother. After the dry cleaners' closed, she went to beauty school and opened a salon.
 Gerry Mendicino as Uncle Taki, Voula's husband, and Angelo and Nikki's father.
 Joey Fatone as Cousin Angelo, Voula's son and Toula's cousin. He runs a couple of small businesses with his "partner" Patrick, who his family soon learns is more than a business partner.
 Bess Meisler as Mana-Yiayia, Toula's grandmother and Kostas's mother. She seems to have mellowed out into a more eccentric, but lovable elderly Greek woman, who no longer mistakes her family for Turks.
 Stavroula Logothettis as Athena Portokalos, Toula's sister. In the first film, she was shown to have four sons, who are older in the second film, and has had two more kids.
 Ian Gomez as Mike, Ian's best friend. In the first film, he worked as another teacher in the same school Ian works. In the second film, he now works as a cop for the Chicago Police Department and is married to one of Toula's cousins, whom he met at Toula and Ian's wedding in the first film.
 Mark Margolis as Panos Portokalos, Kostas's brother from Greece
 John Stamos as George, a Greek-American news anchor
 Rita Wilson as Anna, George's wife.
 Alex Wolff as Bennett, Paris's love interest
 Bruce Gray as Rodney Miller, Ian's father
 Fiona Reid as Harriet Miller, Ian's mother
 Jayne Eastwood as Mrs. White, the Portokalos' neighbor, who tends to complain about the Portokalos family's antics.
 Kathy Greenwood as Marge, a neighbor and former classmate of Toula's. Alongside with Mrs. White, she makes fun of the Portokalos family for being loud and weird throughout the film.
 Rob Riggle as Northwestern Rep
 Ashleigh Rains as Wedding Planner
 Jeff White as Patrick, Angelo's romantic and business partner.

Production
In a 2009 interview for her film My Life in Ruins, asked about a possible sequel to the 2002 hit romantic comedy My Big Fat Greek Wedding, Nia Vardalos stated that she had an idea for a sequel and had started writing it, hinting that, like Ruins, the film would be set in Greece.

Asked about a sequel again in a November 2012 interview, she stated:

On May 27, 2014, various news and media outlets reported that a sequel was in the works. Vardalos later confirmed this via Twitter, and wrote the script for the film. Universal Pictures acquired the US distribution rights to the film on November 11, 2014, and Kirk Jones was set to direct, based on the script by Vardalos, who also starred.

Filming
Principal photography began on May 10, 2015 in Toronto, and ended on June 28.

Release
On May 21, 2015, Universal set the film for a March 25, 2016 release.

On November 11, 2015, the first trailer was released during an airing of NBC's The Today Show.

Home media
My Big Fat Greek Wedding 2 was released on DVD and Blu-ray on June 21, 2016.

Reception

Box office
In its opening weekend, the film was projected to gross $15 million from 3,133 theaters. It grossed $7.2 million on its first day and $17.9 million in its opening weekend, finishing third at the box office behind Batman v Superman: Dawn of Justice ($166 million) and Zootopia ($24 million). In its second weekend, the film grossed $11.2 million (a 37.2% drop), again finishing third behind Batman v Superman ($51.3 million) and Zootopia ($19.3 million).

Critical reception
On Rotten Tomatoes, the film has an approval rating of 28% based on 172 reviews, with an average rating of 4.6/10. The site's critical consensus reads, "My Big Fat Greek Wedding 2 is as sweet and harmless as the original, but its collection of sitcom gags and stereotypes never coalesces into anything resembling a story with a purpose." Metacritic gave the film a weighted average score of 37 out of 100, based on 32 critics, indicating "generally unfavorable reviews". Audiences polled by CinemaScore gave the film an average grade of "A−" on an A+ to F scale.

Sequel
In late June 2016, Vardalos hinted at the possibility of a third film, saying that although no writing has been done, she does have an idea. On April 8, 2021, it was announced that My Big Fat Greek Wedding 3 was in development, to be written by Vardalos as an independent film, who is also set to reprise her role as co-star. The project was also revealed to have been delayed by the COVID-19 pandemic, in which production will commence once the studios maintain insurance for its crew, with principal photography scheduled to take place in Greece. On October 1, 2021, Vardalos confirmed that the script for the third film had been completed and that it would involve another Greek wedding. On May 15, 2022, it was announced that filming will take place throughout Greece in the summer of 2022, with large portions being shot on Corfu from July 5 to August 3, 2022. On June 22, 2022, it was announced that Vardalos will serve as director on the third film. Principal photography commenced on June 22, 2022 in Athens, Greece, and wrapped on August 10, 2022. The film is expected to be dedicated to the memory of Michael Constantine, who died on August 31, 2021 at the age of 94. The project will be a joint-venture production between The Playtone Company, Gold Circle Films, HBO Films, and Focus Features. The film is scheduled to be released on September 8, 2023.

References

External links
 
 
 Official screenplay

2016 films
2010s English-language films
2016 LGBT-related films
2016 romantic comedy films
American LGBT-related films
American romantic comedy films
American sequel films
Films about Greek-American culture
Films about proms
Films about weddings
Films directed by Kirk Jones
Films produced by Tom Hanks
Films produced by Gary Goetzman
Films scored by Christopher Lennertz
Films set in Chicago
Films shot in Toronto
Films with screenplays by Nia Vardalos
Gold Circle Films films
HBO Films films
Playtone films
Universal Pictures films
2010s American films